KMML may refer to, 

 Kerala Minerals and Metals(KMML), is a titanium dioxide manufacturing company in the city of Kollam, India
 KMML, is a radio station licensed to Cimarron, Kansas, USA
 Southwest Minnesota Regional Airportis an airport in United States with an assigned ICAO code 'KMML'